Makerere University Hospital, is a private community hospital, in Kampala, in the Central Region of Uganda.

Location
The coordinates of Makerere University Hospital are 0°19'40.0"N, 32°34'15.0"E (Latitude:0.327771; Longitude:32.570843).

Overview
The 32-bed hospital serves both outpatients and inpatients. It caters to Makerere University staff and students, and the community around.

Departments
The hospital also has the following departments:

1. Clinical Medicine

2. Imaging Department

3. Laboratory Department

4. Optometry Department

5. Nursing Department

6. Medical Records Department

7. Ambulance & Evacuation

8. Dental School & Hospital

History
Prior to 1972, the university maintained a health post known as Makerere University Students Health Service or Sick Bay at the current location of Makerere University Police Post. In 1972, when Idi Amin expelled the Ugandan Asians, the university acquired the premises formerly known as Nile Nursing Home. The university Sick Bay relocated to the new premises. On 16 February 1978, President Idi Amin visited the Sick Bay and he crowned it the Hospital status; thus the name Makerere University Hospital. As of October 2020, the hospital had inpatient capacity of 32 beds.

See also
 List of hospitals in Uganda

References

External links
 Website of Makerere University Hospital

Hospitals in Uganda
Hospitals established in 1978
1978 establishments in Uganda
Makerere University
Kampala Central Division
Central Region, Uganda